Arc Dome is the highest mountain of the Toiyabe Range in northwestern Nye County, Nevada, United States. It is the thirteenth-highest mountain in the state. Arc Dome also ranks as the second-most topographically prominent peak in Nye County and the eighth-most prominent peak in the state.

Arc Dome is sometimes confused with Toiyabe Dome. The fact that the summit benchmark is marked “Toiyabe Dome” only adds to this confusion. However, these are separate peaks.

See also
 List of Ultras of the United States

References

External links
 
 

Mountains of Nevada
Landforms of Nye County, Nevada
Mountains of the Great Basin
Humboldt–Toiyabe National Forest